In mathematics, a monogenic semigroup is a semigroup generated by a single element. Monogenic semigroups are also called cyclic semigroups.

Structure
There are two possibilities for the monogenic semigroup  :
 a m =  a n ⇒ m = n.
 There exist m ≠ n such that a m =  a n.
In the former case  is isomorphic to the semigroup ( {1, 2, ...}, + ) of natural numbers under addition. In such a case,  is an infinite monogenic semigroup and  the element a is said to have infinite order. It is sometimes called the free monogenic semigroup because it is also a free semigroup with one generator.

In the latter case let m be the smallest positive integer such that a m =  a x for some positive integer x ≠ m, and let r be smallest positive integer such that a m =  a m + r. The positive integer m is referred to as the index and the positive integer r as the period of the monogenic semigroup . The order of a is defined as m+r-1. The period and the index satisfy the following properties:
 a m =  a m + r
 a m + x =  a m + y if and only if m + x ≡  m + y ( mod r )
  = {a, a2, ... , a m + r − 1}
 Ka = {am, a m + 1, ... It is called the kernel of a and it is the minimal ideal of the monogenic semigroup .

The pair ( m, r ) of positive integers determine the structure of monogenic semigroups. For every pair ( m, r ) of positive integers, there does exist a monogenic semigroup having index m and period r.  The monogenic semigroup having index m and period r is denoted by M ( m, r ). The monogenic semigroup M ( 1, r ) is the cyclic group of order r.

The results in this section actually hold for any element a of an arbitrary semigroup and the monogenic subsemigroup  it generates.

Related notions
A related notion is that of periodic semigroup (also called torsion semigroup), in which every element has finite order (or, equivalently, in which every mongenic subsemigroup is finite). A more general class is that of quasi-periodic semigroups (aka group-bound semigroups or epigroups) in which every element of the semigroup has a power that lies in a subgroup.

An aperiodic semigroup is one in which every monogenic subsemigroup has a period of 1.

See also
 Cycle detection, the problem of finding the parameters of a finite monogenic semigroup using a bounded amount of storage space
 Special classes of semigroups

References

Algebraic structures
Semigroup theory